Hunters Green or Hunter's Green is a neighborhood within the city limits of Tampa, Florida. As of the 2010 census the neighborhood had a population of 5,056. The ZIP Codes serving the neighborhood are 33592 and 33647. The neighborhood is located within the district of New Tampa. The neighborhood was fully established in 1991.

Geography
Hunters Green boundaries are Cross Creek Boulevard to the north, Highland Oak Drive to the east and Bruce B. Downs Boulevard to the west.

Demographics
As of the census of 2010, there were 5,056 people and 1,853 households residing in the neighborhood. The population density was 2,856/mi2. The racial makeup of the neighborhood was 74% White, 13% African American, 0% Native American, 7% Asian, 3% from other races, and 2% from two or more races. Hispanic or Latino of any race were 16% of the population.

There were 1,853 households, out of which 42% had children under the age of 18 living with them, 59% were married couples living together, 14% had a female householder with no husband present, and 6% were non-families. 18% of all households were made up of individuals.

In the neighborhood the population was spread out, with 29% under the age of 18, 20% from 18 to 34, 23% from 35 to 49, 20% from 50 to 64, and 8% who were 65 years of age or older. For every 100 females, there were 91.3 males.

The per capita income for the neighborhood was $39,892. About 3% of the population were below the poverty line, 15% of those are under the age of 18.

See also
Neighborhoods in Tampa, Florida

References

External links
Official website

Neighborhoods in Tampa, Florida